The Bellefontaine Bridge is a four-span truss railroad bridge over the Missouri River between St. Charles County, Missouri, and St. Louis County, Missouri. It has four  spans. Construction started on July 4, 1892, and the bridge opened on December 27, 1893.

The bridge was built by the Chicago, Burlington and Quincy Railroad and is now owned and operated by BNSF Railway. New Jersey Steel and Iron Company of Trenton, New Jersey, served as the contractor for the original construction, and George S. Morison designed the structure. Notably, the bridge was one of the first to use a Baltimore truss design; the nearby Merchants Bridge (also designed by Morison) used a Pennsylvania through truss design and had opened just a few years prior. The truss spans are found on masonry piers, which were constructed atop caissons founded into bedrock below the river.

The structure is the last railroad structure over the Missouri River before its confluence with the Mississippi River.

See also
List of bridges documented by the Historic American Engineering Record in Missouri
List of crossings of the Missouri River

References

External links

Bridgehunter.com profile

Railroad bridges in Missouri
Bridges in St. Louis County, Missouri
Bridges in St. Charles County, Missouri
Bridges completed in 1893
Historic American Engineering Record in Missouri
Truss bridges in the United States
BNSF Railway bridges
Chicago, Burlington and Quincy Railroad
Bridges over the Missouri River
Baltimore truss bridges
1893 establishments in Missouri